Lithium tetramethylpiperidide (often abbreviated LiTMP or LTMP) is a chemical compound with the molecular formula . It is used as a non-nucleophilic base, being comparable to LiHMDS in terms of steric hindrance.

Synthesis
It is synthesised by the deprotonation of 2,2,6,6-tetramethylpiperidine with n-butyllithium at −78 °C. Recent reports show that this reaction can also be performed 0 °C. The compound is stable in a THF/ethylbenzene solvent mixture and is commercially available as such.

Structure
Like many lithium reagents it has a tendency to aggregate, forming a tetramer in the solid state.

See also
Lithium diisopropylamide
Lithium amide

References 

Lithium compounds
Non-nucleophilic bases
Organolithium compounds
Reagents for organic chemistry